The Anglo-Iraqi Treaty of 1930 was a treaty of alliance between the United Kingdom of Great Britain and Northern Ireland and the British-Mandate-controlled administration of the Hashemite Kingdom of Iraq.  The treaty was between the governments of George V of the United Kingdom and Faisal I of Iraq.  High Commissioner Francis Humphrys signed for the United Kingdom and Prime Minister Nuri as-Said signed for Iraq.  The 1930 treaty was based upon an earlier Anglo-Iraqi Treaty of 1922 but took into account Iraq's increased importance to British interests given new oil finds made in 1927.

Background
During the Mesopotamian campaign of the First World War, the British Army (alongside troops from the Commonwealth), fighting on the side of Allies, defeated the forces of the Ottoman Empire, fighting on the side the Central Powers. After the end of the First World War, British troops remained in the region which became the Kingdom of Iraq. In 1920, after the Ottoman Empire was partitioned, the United Kingdom formally established control over what was to become Iraq under a mandate from the League of Nations.

The Kingdom of Iraq began with the coronation of King Faisal I on 23 August 1921. The 1930 treaty provided a path towards nominal independence for Iraq two years later at the termination of the mandate and upon the entry of Iraq itself as a member of the League of Nations. The main purpose of the treaty was to give the British a variety of commercial and military rights within the country after independence.

British Prime Minister Winston Churchill was to write that the 1930 treaty provided that the British could maintain air bases near Basra and Habbaniya "in times of peace" and have the right of transit for military forces and supplies "at all times". In addition, Churchill indicated that the treaty would provide "all possible facilities" including the use of railways, rivers, ports, and airways for the passage of armed forces "during times of war".

The treaty gave the British almost unlimited rights to base military forces in Iraq. It further provided for the unconditional and unlimited right of the British to move troops into or through Iraq. In 1941, the terms of the treaty were used to justify a British invasion and the occupation of Iraq after a nationalist coup whose leaders had contacts among the Axis powers.

The British used the terms of the treaty as a basis for a military occupation that lasted until end of 1947. As they prepared to depart Iraq, an attempt was made to get the Iraqi government to sign a new military treaty giving the British increased powers than under the 1930 treaty. While that treaty was approved, it never came into effect because of unrest and large demonstrations in Iraq against it.

Full text
TREATY  OF ALLIANCE BETWEEN HIS MAJESTY IN RESPECT OF THE UNITED KINGDOM AND HIS MAJESTY THE KING OF 'IRAQ. SIGNED AT BAGHDAD, 30 JUNE 1930.

His MAJESTY THE KING OF GREAT BRITAIN, IRELAND AND THE BRITISH DOMINIONS BEYOND THE SEAS, EMPEROR OF INDIA, and His MAJESTY THE KING OF 'IRAQ, whereas they desire to consolidate the friendship and to maintain and perpetuate the relations of good understanding between their respective countries; and Whereas His Britannic Majesty undertook in the Treaty of Alliance signed at Baghdad on the thirteenth day of January, One thousand nine hundred and twenty-six of the Christian Era, corresponding to the twenty-eighth day of Jamadi-al-Ukhra, One thousand three hundred and forty-four, Hijrah, that he would take into active consideration at successive intervals of four years the question whether it was possible for him to press for the admission of 'Iraq into the League of Nations; and

Whereas His Majesty's Government in the United Kingdom of Great Britain and Northern Ireland informed the 'Iraq Government without qualification or proviso on the fourteenth day of September, One thousand nine hundred and twenty-nine that they were prepared to support the candidature of 'Iraq for admission to the League of Nations in the year One thousand nine hundred and thirty-two and announced to the Council of the League on the fourth day of November, One thousand nine hundred and twenty-nine, that this was their intention; and

Whereas the mandatory responsibilities accepted by His Britannic Majesty in respect of 'Iraq will automatically terminate upon the admission of 'Iraq to the League of Nations; and Whereas His Britannic Majesty and His Majesty the King of 'Iraq consider that the relations which will subsist between them as independent sovereigns should be defined by the conclusion of a Treaty of Alliance and Amity:

Have agreed to conclude a new Treaty for this purpose on terms of complete freedom, equality and independence which will become operative upon the entry of 'Iraq into the League of Nations, and have appointed as their Plenipotentiaries:

His MAJESTY THE KING OF GREAT BRITAIN, IRELAND, AND THE BRITISH DOMINIONS BEYOND THE SEAS, EMPEROR OF INDIA, FOR GREAT BRITAIN AND NORTHERN IRELAND:
Lieutenant-Colonel Sir Francis Henry HUMPHRYS, Knight Grand Cross of the Royal Victorian Order, Knight Commander of the Most Distinguished Order of Saint Michael and Saint George, Knight Commander of the Most Excellent Order of the British Empire, Companion of the Most Eminent Order of the Indian Empire, High Commissioner of His Britannic Majesty in 'Iraq; and

His MAJESTY THE KING OF 'IRAQ:
General Nuri Pasha al SA'ID, Order of the Nadha, Second Class, Order of the Istiqlal, Second Class, Companion of the Most Distinguished Order of Saint Michael and Saint George, Companion of the Distinguished Service Order, Prime Minister of the 'Iraq Government and Minister for Foreign Affairs; Who having communicated their full powers, found in due form, have agreed as follows:

Article 1.

There shall be perpetual peace and friendship between His Britannic Majesty and His Majesty the King of 'Iraq.
There shall be established between the High Contracting Parties a close alliance in consecration of their friendship, their cordial understanding and their good relations, and there shall be full and frank consultation between them in all matters of foreign policy which may affect their common interests.

Each of the High Contracting Parties undertakes not to adopt in foreign countries an attitude which is inconsistent with the alliance or might create difficulties for the other party thereto.

Article 2.

Each High Contracting Party will be represented at the Court of the other High Contracting Party by a diplomatic representative duly accredited.

Article 3.

Should any dispute between 'Iraq and a third State produce a situation which involves the risk of a rupture with that State, the High Contracting Parties will concert together with a view to the settlement of the said dispute by peaceful means in accordance with the provisions of the Covenant of the League of Nations and of any other international obligation which may be applicable to the case.

Article 4.

Should, notwithstanding the provisions of Article 3 above, either of the High Contracting Parties become engaged in war, the other High Contracting Party will, subject always to the provisions of Article 9 below, immediately come to his aid in the capacity of an ally. In the event of an imminent menace of war the High Contracting Parties will immediately concert together the necessary measures of defence. The aid of His Majesty the King of 'Iraq in the event of war or the imminent menace of war will consist in furnishing to His Britannic Majesty on 'Iraq territory all facilities and assistance in his power including the use of railways, rivers, ports, aerodromes and means of communication.

Article 5.

It is understood between the High Contracting Parties that responsibility for the maintenance of internal order in 'Iraq and, subject to the provisions of Article 4 above, for the defence of 'Iraq from external aggression rests with His Majesty the King of 'Iraq. Nevertheless, His Majesty the King of 'Iraq recognises that the permanent maintenance and protection in all circumstances of the essential communications of His Britannic Majesty is in the common interest of the High Contracting Parties.

For this purpose and in order to facilitate the discharge of the obligations of His Britanic Majesty under Article 4 above His Majesty the King of 'Iraq undertakes to grant to His Britannic Majesty for the duration of the Alliance sites for air bases to be selected by His Britannic Majesty at or in the vicinity of Basra and for an air base to be selected by His Britannic Majesty to the west of the Euphrates. His Majesty the King of 'Iraq further authorises His Britannic Majesty to maintain forces upon 'Iraq territory at the above localities in accordance with the provisions of the Annexure of this Treaty on the understanding that the presence of those forces shall not constitute in any manner an occupation and will in no way prejudice the sovereign rights of 'Iraq.

Article 6.

The Annexure hereto shall be regarded as an integral part of the present Treaty.

Article 7.

This Treaty shall replace the Treaties of Alliance signed at Baghdad on the tenth day of October, One thousand nine hundred and twenty-two of the Christian Era 1, corresponding to the nineteenth day of Safar, One thousand three hundred and forty-one, Hijrah, and on the thirteenth day of January, One thousand nine hundred and twenty-six, of the Christian Era 2, corresponding to the twenty-eighth day of Jamadi-al-Ukhra, One thousand three hundred and forty-four, Hijrah, and the subsidiary agreements thereto, which shall cease to have effect upon the entry into force of this Treaty. It shall be executed in duplicate, in the English and Arabic languages, of which the former shall be regarded as the authoritative version.

Article 8.

The High Contracting Parties recognise that, upon the entry into force of this Treaty, all responsibilities devolving under the Treaties and Agreements referred to in Article 7 hereof upon His Britannic Majesty in respect of 'Iraq will, in so far as His Britannic Majesty is concerned, then automatically and completely come to an end, and that such responsibilities, in so far as they continue at all, will devolve upon His Majesty the King of 'Iraq alone.

It is also recognised that all responsibilities devolving upon His Britannic Majesty in respect of 'Iraq under any other international instrument, in so far as they continue at all, should similarly devolve upon His Majesty the King of 'Iraq alone, and the High Contracting Parties shall immediately take such steps as may be necessary to secure the transference to His Majesty the King of 'Iraq of these responsibilities.

Article 9.

Nothing in the present Treaty is intended to or shall in any way prejudice the rights and obligations which devolve, or may devolve, upon either of the High Contracting Parties under the Covenant of the League of Nations or the Treaty for the Renunciation of War signed at Paris on the twenty-seventh day of August, One thousand nine hundred and twenty-eight.

Article 10.

Should any difference arise relative to the application or the interpretation of this Treaty and should the High Contracting Parties fail to settle such difference by direct negotiation, then it shall be dealt with in accordance with the provisions of the Covenant of the League of Nations.

Article 11.

This Treaty shall be ratified and ratifications shall be exchanged as soon as possible. Thereafter it shall come into force as soon as 'Iraq has been admitted to membership of the League of Nations. The present Treaty shall remain in force for a period of twenty-five years from the date of its coming into force. At any time after twenty years from the date of the coming into force of this Treaty, the High Contracting Parties will, at the request of either of them, conclude a new Treaty which shall provide for the continued maintenance and protection in all circumstances of the essential communications of His Britannic Majesty. In case of disagreement in this matter the difference will be submitted to the Council of the League of Nations. In faith whereof the respective Plenipotentiaries have signed the present Treaty and have affixed thereto their seals. Done at Baghdad in duplicate this thirtieth day of June, One thousand nine hundred and thirty, of the Christian Era, corresponding to the fourth day of Safar, One thousand three hundred and forty-nine, Hijrah.

(L. S.) F. H. HUMPHRYS.

(L. S.) Noury SAID.

Annexure To Treaty of Alliance.

Clause 1. 
The strength of the forces maintained in 'Iraq by His Britannic Majesty in accordance with the terms of Article 5 of this Treaty shall be determined by His Britannic Majesty from time to time after consultation with His Majesty the King of 'Iraq.
His Britannic Majesty shall maintain forces at Hinaidi for a period of five years after the entry into force of this Treaty in order to enable His Majesty the King of 'Iraq to organise the necessary forces to replace them. By the expiration of that period the said forces of His Britannic Majesty shall have been withdrawn from Hinaidi. It shall be also open to His Britannic Majesty to maintain forces at Mosul for a maximum period of five years from the entry into force of this Treaty. Thereafter it shall be open to His Britannic Majesty to station his forces in the localities mentioned in Article 5 of this Treaty, and His Majesty the King of 'Iraq will grant to His Britannic Majesty for the duration of the Alliance leases of the necessary sites for the accommodation of the forces of His Britannic Majesty in those localities.

Clause 2. 
Subject to any modifications which the two High Contracting Parties may agree to introduce in the future, the immunities and privileges in jurisdictional and fiscal matters, including freedom from taxation, enjoyed by the British forces in 'Iraq will continue to extend to the forces referred to in Clause 1 above and to such of His Britannic Majesty's forces of all arms as may be in 'Iraq in pursuance of the present Treaty and its annexure or otherwise by agreement between the High Contracting Parties, and the existing provisions of any local legislation affecting the armed forces of His Britannic Majesty in 'Iraq shall also continue. The 'Iraq Government will take the necessary steps to ensure that the altered conditions will not render the position of the British forces as regards immunities and privileges in any way less favourable than that enjoyed by them at the date of the entry into force of this Treaty.

Clause 3. 
His Majesty the King of 'Iraq agrees to provide all possible facilities for the movement, training and maintenance of the forces referred to in Clause 1 above and to accord to those forces the same facilities for the use of wireless telegraphy as those enjoyed by them at the date of the entry into force of the present Treaty.

Clause 4. 
His Majesty the King of 'Iraq undertakes to provide at the request and at the expense of His Britannic Majesty and upon such conditions as may be agreed between the High Contracting Parties special guards from his own forces for the protection of such air bases as may, in accordance with the provisions of this Treaty, be occupied by the forces of His Britannic Majesty, and to secure the enactment of such legislation as may be necessary for the fulfilment of the conditions referred to above.

Clause 5. 
His Britannic Majesty undertakes to grant whenever they may be required by His Majesty the King of 'Iraq all possible facilities in the following matters, the cost of which will be met by His Majesty the King of 'Iraq.
1. Naval, military and aeronautical instruction of 'Iraqi officers in the United Kingdom.
2. The provision of arms, ammunition, equipment, ships and aeroplanes of the latest available pattern for the forces of His Majesty the King of 'Iraq.
3. The provision of British naval, military and air force officers to serve in an advisory capacity with the forces of His Majesty the King of 'Iraq.

Clause 6. 
In view of the desirability of identity in training and methods between the 'Iraq and British armies. His Majesty the King of 'Iraq undertakes that, should he deem it necessary to have recourse to foreign military instructors, these shall be chosen from amongst British subjects. He further undertakes that any personnel of his forces that may be sent abroad for military training will be sent to military schools, colleges and training centres in the territories of His Britannic Majesty, provided that this shall not prevent him from sending to any other country such personnel as cannot be received in the said institutions and training centres. He further undertakes that the armament and essential equipment of his forces shall not differ in type from those of the forces of His Britannic Majesty.

Clause 7. 
His Majesty the King of 'Iraq agrees to afford, when requested to do so by His Britannic Majesty, all possible facilities for the movement of the forces of His Britannic Majesty of all arms in transit across 'Iraq and for the transport and storage of all supplies and equipment that may be required by these forces during their passage across 'Iraq. These facilities shall cover the use of the roads, railways, waterways, ports and aerodromes of 'Iraq, and His Britannic Majesty's ships shall have general permission to visit the Shatt-al-Arab on the understanding that His Majesty the King of 'Iraq is given prior notification of visits to 'Iraq ports.

(Initialled)

F. H. H.

N. S.

See also
 Sykes–Picot Agreement
 Anglo-French Declaration of November 1918
 Treaty of Sèvres
 Anglo-Iraqi Treaty of 1922
 Treaty of Lausanne
 British Mandate of Mesopotamia
 United Kingdom of Great Britain and Northern Ireland
 Kingdom of Iraq
 RAF Iraq Command
 RAF Habbaniya
 RAF Hinaidi
 RAF Shaibah
 1941 Iraqi coup d'état
 Anglo-Iraqi War

Notes

References

External links

Treaties of Mandatory Iraq
Bilateral treaties of the United Kingdom
1930 in the United Kingdom
1930 in Iraq
Interwar-period treaties
Treaties concluded in 1930
Military alliances involving Iraq
Military alliances involving the United Kingdom
20th-century military alliances
Iraq–United Kingdom relations
Kingdom of Iraq